Between the Buttons is the fifth British and seventh American studio album by the English rock band the Rolling Stones, released on 20 January 1967 in the UK and on 11 February in the US as the follow-up to Aftermath. It reflected the Stones' brief foray into psychedelia and baroque pop balladry during the era. It is among the band's most musically eclectic works; multi-instrumentalist Brian Jones abandoned his guitar on much of the album, instead playing a wide variety of other instruments including organ, marimba, vibraphone, and kazoo. Piano contributions came from two session players: former Rolling Stones member Ian Stewart and frequent contributor Jack Nitzsche. It would be the last album produced by Andrew Loog Oldham, who had to this point acted as the band's manager and produced all of their albums.

As with prior albums, the American and British versions contained slightly different track listings. The American version of Between the Buttons, which includes "Let's Spend the Night Together" and "Ruby Tuesday", is on the 2003 and 2012 versions of Rolling Stone magazine's 500 Greatest Albums of All Time. Between the Buttons reached number 3 on the British album charts and number 2 on the US Billboard Top LPs chart.

Recording and background
As he had begun to on the previous album, Aftermath, Brian Jones introduced a large number of different instruments to the recording sessions. Originally co-lead guitarist with Keith Richards, Jones had become less interested in electric guitar as an instrument, and on this album he only contributed electric guitar on one track apiece on the American release and the British version. Bill Wyman plays bass on all except three tracks (which instead feature Richards on bass), and drummer Charlie Watts and lead singer Mick Jagger appear on all tracks. Piano duties were split by two session players: original Rolling Stones member Ian Stewart and frequent contributor Jack Nitzsche.

Early sessions for the album occurred between 3 August 1966 and the 11th at Los Angeles' RCA Studios during the Rolling Stones' 1966 American Tour. David Hassinger was the engineer for the album. Several songs were worked on; the backing tracks of six songs that would appear on the album were recorded, as were those of "Let's Spend the Night Together" and "Who's Driving Your Plane?", the B-side of "Have You Seen Your Mother, Baby, Standing in the Shadow?", released as a single in late September. During this time, Brian Wilson of the Beach Boys was invited down to RCA Studios during the recording of "My Obsession", which remains one of his favourite Rolling Stones songs.

The band returned to London and sessions continued at IBC Studios from 31 August until 3 September. "Have You Seen Your Mother, Baby, Standing in the Shadow?" was completed to be released on 23 September before the Stones embarked on their seventh British tour, which lasted into early October and was their last UK tour until 1971.

The second block of recording sessions for Between the Buttons began on 8 November at the newly opened Olympic Sound Studios in Barnes, London, alternating between Olympic and Pye Studios until 26 November. During this time the bulk of the album was completed, including vocal and other overdubs on the previously recorded backing tracks and mixing. "Ruby Tuesday" was also completed.

Around the same time producer Andrew Loog Oldham was also preparing the US-only live album Got Live If You Want It!, a contractual requirement from London Records that contained live performances from their recent British tour as well as studio tracks overdubbed with audience noise. After that album's release on 10 December, a final overdubbing session for Buttons was held at Olympic Studio on 13 December 1966 before Oldham took the tapes back to RCA Studios in Hollywood for final mixing and editing.

The album was recorded using 4-track machines, with tracks of the initial sessions mixed down in order to free the tracks for use as overdubs. Mick Jagger felt this process lost the clarity of the songs, commenting during an interview that "we bounced it back to do overdubs so many times we lost the sound of it. [The songs] sounded so great, but later on I was really disappointed with it." He commented further: "I don't know, it just isn't any good. 'Back Street Girl' is about the only one I like." In an interview with New Musical Express, he even called the rest of the album "more or less rubbish."

Between the Buttons would be the last album wholly produced by Oldham, with whom the Stones fell out in mid-1967 during the recording sessions for Their Satanic Majesties Request.

Artwork
The photo shoot for the album cover took place in November 1966 on Primrose Hill in North London. The photographer was Gered Mankowitz, who also shot the band photos for the cover of Out of Our Heads. The shoot took place at 5:30 in the morning following an all-night recording session at Olympic Studios. Using a home-made camera filter constructed of black card, glass and Vaseline, Mankowitz created the effect of the Stones dissolving into their surroundings. The goal of the shoot was, in Mankowitz's words, "to capture the ethereal, druggy feel of the time; that feeling at the end of the night when dawn was breaking and they'd been up all night making music, stoned." 

The cover photo was shot at the Primrose Hill viewpoint in the misty early-morning sunlight, looking west. Brian Jones' disheveled and gaunt appearance disturbed many of his fans, and critic David Dalton wrote that he looked "like a doomed albino raccoon." "Brian [Jones] was lurking in his collar", Mankowitz commented years later. "I was frustrated because it felt like we were on the verge of something really special and he was messing it up. But the way Brian appeared to not give a shit is exactly what the band was about." Outtakes from this photo session were later used for the cover and inner sleeves of the 1972 ABKCO compilation release More Hot Rocks (Big Hits & Fazed Cookies).

The back cover of Between the Buttons is dominated by a six-panel cartoon accompanied by a rhythmic poem drawn by drummer Charlie Watts. When Watts asked Oldham what the title of the album would be, he told him it was "between the buttons", a term meaning "undecided". Watts gave the phrase to the title of his cartoon which in turn became the title of the album. On the album cover itself, the band name and album title appear on the buttons on Watts' overcoat. Often difficult to see, this text was included blown-up on a hype-sticker affixed to original US pressings and would also be added to the bottom corners of the artwork for several CD and LP reissues.

Marketing and sales 

Between the Buttons, like many British long-players, differed between its UK and US versions. The UK edition (in the form Oldham and the Stones intended it) was issued on 20 January 1967 (Mono, LK 4852; Stereo, SKL 4852) on Decca Records, concurrently with a separate single, "Let's Spend the Night Together" b/w "Ruby Tuesday". As was common in the British record industry at the time, the single did not appear on the album. Between the Buttons reached number three in the UK.  In the US, the album was released the following day by London Records on 21 January 1967 (mono, LL 3499; stereo, PS 499). "Let's Spend the Night Together" and "Ruby Tuesday" were slotted onto the album while "Back Street Girl" and "Please Go Home" were removed (these would be included on the following US odds-and-ends release, Flowers, in July 1967). With "Ruby Tuesday" reaching number one, Between the Buttons shot to number two in the US, going gold.

In August 2002, both editions of Between the Buttons were reissued in a new remastered CD and SACD digipak by ABKCO Records. Almost all reissues of the album since 1968 have been in stereo; in 2016, the album's mono release was reissued on CD, vinyl, and digital download as part of The Rolling Stones in Mono. While most reissues have used the US track-listing to maximise profit by featuring the two hit singles, the UK version was re-issued by ABKCO in 2003 on 180 gram vinyl in the US.

Critical reception and legacy 

Between the Buttons was called "among the greatest rock albums" by Robert Christgau, who later included it in his "Basic Record Library" of 1950s and 1960s recordings, published in Christgau's Record Guide: Rock Albums of the Seventies (1981). He also wrote of the album for Rolling Stone magazine's "40 Essential Albums of 1967": "[T]his underrated keeper is distinguished by complex rhymes, complex sexual stereotyping, and the non-blues, oh-so-rock-and-roll pianos of Ian Stewart, Jack Nitzsche, Nicky Hopkins, and Brian Jones." 

AllMusic's Richie Unterberger hailed it as one of the Rolling Stones' "strongest, most eclectic LPs". In a retrospective review for Entertainment Weekly, David Browne called the album "a cheeky set of sardonic Swinging London vaudeville rock", while Billboard magazine's Christopher Walsh wrote that "it's brimming with overlooked gems, the band delivering a captivating blend of folky, Beatles-esque pop and tough bluesy rockers." 

Tom Moon wrote in The Rolling Stone Album Guide (2004) that the album was "lighter and thinner" than Aftermath and, "having belatedly discovered pop melody, Jagger and Richards were suddenly overdosing on the stuff." Music scholars Philippe Margotin and Jean-Michel Guesdon observed baroque pop and music hall on the album. Jim DeRogatis included Between the Buttons in his 2003 list of the essential psychedelic rock albums.

In 2003, the American version of Between the Buttons was ranked number 355 on Rolling Stone magazine's 500 Greatest Albums of All Time list, and re-ranked number 357 in 2012. Based on such rankings, the aggregate website Acclaimed Music lists it as the 719th most acclaimed album in history.

Use in other media

In a scene in Wes Anderson's 2001 film The Royal Tenenbaums, the character Margot (Gwyneth Paltrow) plays Between the Buttons on a record player. She cues up the track "She Smiled Sweetly", which is followed by "Ruby Tuesday". ("Ruby Tuesday" appears on the US release of the album, though it does not follow "She Smiled Sweetly" in the track order.)

Track listing

UK edition

US edition

Personnel
As per the American release. Listing below uses track numbers from CD reissues, which combined sides one and two as tracks 1–12.

The Rolling Stones
Mick Jagger – lead vocals and backing vocals, tambourine, bass drum and harmonica
Keith Richards – electric guitar, backing vocals, acoustic guitar, piano, bass, double bass and co-lead vocals
Brian Jones – organ, electric guitar, accordion, recorder, vibraphone, piano, tambourine, harmonica, dulcimer, kazoo, backing vocals, tuba, trombone and trumpet
Bill Wyman – bass, double bass and backing vocals
Charlie Watts – drums and maracas

Additional musicians
Jack Nitzsche – piano and harpsichord
Ian Stewart – piano and organ

Charts

Certifications

References

External links
 

1967 albums
The Rolling Stones albums
Decca Records albums
London Records albums
Albums produced by Andrew Loog Oldham
Albums recorded at Olympic Sound Studios
albums recorded at IBC Studios
ABKCO Records albums